Chrysoula "Chrysi" Diamantopoulou (born September 22, 1995) is a Greek water polo player, who plays as a goalkeeper for European powerhouse Olympiacos and the Greece women's national team. She was part of the Greek team that won the silver medal at the 2018 European Championship in Barcelona and the sixth place at the 2015 World Aquatics Championships.
She is considered as one of the best goalkeeper in the world.

Career

As a professional player Diamantopoulou has won two Greek Women's Water Polo League titles, the Women's LEN Trophy in 2014 and the LEN Women's Euro League in 2015.

International competitions
 2018 Women's European Water Polo Championship, Barcelona, Spain, silver medal
 2012 FINA Women's Water Polo World League, Changsu, China, 3rd place
 2012 FINA Women's World Youth Water Polo Championships, Perth, Australia, 1st place
 2013 FINA Women's Water Polo Junior World Championships, Volos, Greece, 3rd place

References

1995 births
Living people
Greek female water polo players
Olympiacos Women's Water Polo Team players
Water polo players from Athens
21st-century Greek women